Chaturvedi is a surname of Indian origin. The name "Chaturvedi" literally means "Knower of the Four Vedas". It is used by Brahmins; a related surname is Chaubey, which has the same meaning. They are from the families of rishis (saints). The Earlier family was living around Mathura but during the Mughal period some conflict happened between Aurangzeb and Chaturvedi which led to Aurangzeb sending  troops towards villages for chaturvedi and the Mughal King. This event leads to the rehibitions of Chaturvedi some stayed in Mathura, some came out of mathura and settled around Agra region and many moved toward different districts of Bihar. 

Notable people with the surname Chaturvedi include:

 Abhishek Chaubey, film director
 Ashwini Kumar Choubey (born 1953), MP from Buxar in Bihar 
 Avani Chaturvedi, one of the first female fighter pilots of India
 B. K. Chaturvedi, civil servant
 Chaturvedi Badrinath (1933–2010), IAS officer and writer
 Juhi Chaturvedi, screenwriter
 Makhanlal Chaturvedi (1889–1968), Hindi writer
 Nishi Chaturvedi, British epidemiologist
 Priyanka Chaturvedi, previously Indian National Congress spokesperson
 Sanjiv Chaturvedi, bureaucrat
 Siddhant Chaturvedi, actor
 Surendra Chaturvedi (1929–1977), journalist and activist
 T. N. Chaturvedi, Governor of Karnataka from 2002 to 2007

References